Dropship: United Peace Force is a combat flight simulation video game released exclusively for the PlayStation 2. The player assumes the role of a pilot in the United Peace Force, a fictional multinational military organisation charged with combating terrorism and organized crime across the world. The game itself is set in 2050.

Gameplay
The game features a number of futuristic aircraft, including agile fighters, and slower transport aircraft.  The game also features levels in which the player drives military vehicles such as armored personnel carriers.

Unlike many science fiction flight simulator games, Dropship is set in the near future, and the vehicles and weapons, although futuristic, are grounded in reality, and bear many recognizable traits of modern military aircraft. The game has missions where the player must fly low not to be spotted, protect vulnerable craft and deliver/pick up valuable cargo.  Another feature of the game is the VTOL ability of most of the game's aircraft, allowing the player to switch to a hover mode and land the aircraft manually.

Reception

The game received "generally favourable reviews" according to the review aggregation website Metacritic. Maxim gave it a favourable review, a few weeks before it was released Stateside.

Toonami, Cartoon Network's after-school action programming block at the time, reviewed the game in June 2002. In the review, TOM (Steven Blum) said the game "doesn't look too sharp, but it plays okay" and that the problem was he couldn't get beyond the sixth level; "it's driving [him] nuts." The score the game was given ended up being a ? out of 10, as TOM had not yet finished the game.

References

External links

2002 video games
Combat flight simulators
PlayStation 2 games
PlayStation 2-only games
Psygnosis games
Sony Interactive Entertainment games
Video games scored by Alastair Lindsay
Video games set in the 2050s
Video games developed in the United Kingdom